Michelina of Pesaro, (1300 – 1356) was an Italian Roman Catholic Franciscan tertiary who was later beatified.

Biography 

Michelina Metelli was born in  Farneto, Pesaro, Italy, to a wealthy Italian family. She married into the noble Malatesta family at the age of 12 and was widowed by age 20. She led a lifestyle of parties and luxury but, after the death of her only son, she experienced a vision of him in heaven, and decided to become a Franciscan penitent.

She proceeded to give away all her belongings and property, and founded the Confraternity of the Annunciation to care for the poor, nurse the sick and bury the dead. Initially her family believed her to be insane and had her locked up. Upon her release from confinement, she made a pilgrimage to the Holy Land as penance for her sins. It is believed that she received the Stigmata in the course of this journey.

Michelina died at her home in Pesaro on 19 June 1356 of natural causes.

Beatification 
She was beatified on 13 April 1737 by Pope Clement XII.

References 
Blessed Michelina (Metelli Malatesta) of Pesaro 
Blessed Michelina of Pesaro

1300 births
1356 deaths
14th-century venerated Christians
Italian beatified people
Franciscan beatified people
People from Pesaro
Members of the Third Order of Saint Francis
Female saints of medieval Italy
14th-century Christian saints
Stigmatics
Medieval Italian saints
14th-century Italian Roman Catholic religious sisters and nuns
House of Malatesta
Beatifications by Pope Clement XII